The Skinny is a 72-page monthly and bi-monthly publication distributed in approximately 1,450 establishments throughout the cities of Dundee, Edinburgh, Glasgow in Scotland and, from 2013 to 2017, Manchester, Liverpool and Leeds in the north of England. Founded in 2005, the magazine features interviews and articles on music, art, film, comedy and other aspects of culture.

History
The Skinny was founded and launched in 2005 as a free Edinburgh and Glasgow listings magazine. From the outset, the magazine secured interviews with high-profile music acts, including Mogwai, Pearl Jam, Wu-Tang Clan, DJ Shadow and Muse as well as becoming early champions for Scottish bands such as Frightened Rabbit and The Twilight Sad.

In August 2006, The Skinny formed a partnership with established Edinburgh Festival magazine Fest. The first year of this partnership saw the publication renamed SkinnyFest, before it reverted to the title Fest in 2007.

In May 2007, The Skinny began to distribute copies in Dundee and Fife in a move that was presented as the first step in a plan to establish distribution  throughout Scotland.

The Skinny was originally set up as a social enterprise by a collective and sustained this way of working until July 2007, when it became a private company limited by shares in order to take on new investment.

In September 2007, The Skinny began the annual publication of a Student Guide. The guide is distributed through a number of Scottish universities and art colleges. 

In December 2007, The Skinny ran a conference on the future of the music industry called ON:07, in the Reid Hall at the University of Edinburgh. The delegates included Peter Jenner, former manager of Pink Floyd and The Clash, and secretary-general of the International Music Managers Forum; Simon Frith, Tovey Professor of Music at Edinburgh University and the founder of the Mercury Prize for music; Evan Cohen, Director of Strategy and Communications for social-networking website Bebo; and Will Page, Executive Director of Research for the MCPS-PRS Alliance. As keynote speaker Peter Jenner called for a standard charge to be applied to Internet Service Provider connections to cover all music downloads – effectively a form of music tax.

In April 2008, The Skinny launched a new website, moving listings information online and providing guides to venues around Scotland.

The Skinny launched its Northwest edition in April 2013, focusing on cultural happenings in Manchester and Liverpool. In September 2016 this was expanded to include Leeds. The Skinny discontinued its North West edition in 2017, although it continues to review events in the North West of England on its website.

Content
As a listings magazine, The Skinny largely runs content that relates to events taking place within its catchment area during the month covered by the issue. This consists for the most part of previews, reviews, and feature interviews.

In March 2007, the magazine secured the first UK interview with Arcade Fire after the release of hit album Neon Bible. The following month, it secured the first UK magazine cover for the band Battles in anticipation of the release of their debut album Mirrored.

In July 2007, the magazine ran an "opposites issue" with Queens of the Stone Age on the cover, which took an unusual slant on The Skinny'''s usual content, and featured the first reversed-logo masthead on a UK magazine.

In June 2008, the magazine said that they would dedicate an entire issue to sex workers.

AssociationsThe Skinny has established itself as a 'media partner' for a range of events, including Edinburgh International Film Festival, Edinburgh International Book Festival, Edinburgh Art Festival, Glasgay, dozens of music festivals across the UK and Europe, and has previously had a long-running association with popular music radio station Xfm Scotland.

In September 2013, when Canongate Books celebrated its fortieth anniversary, The Skinny helped them compile "The Future 40"- a list of Scottish storytellers they predicted would have a cultural impact over the next four decades.

Awards
In 2006, Jasper Hamill won the Press Gazette / Reuters Student Interviewer of the Year, for his piece "Another View" – an interview with avant-garde musician John Cale.

Also in 2006, Miles Johnson was awarded the Allen Wright Award for Excellence in Journalism for his feature "Bowling with The Hamiltons", beating off competition from The Scotsman, The List and the Sunday Herald.

In 2008, The Skinny Fest'' was a commended runner up at the Herald's Scottish Student Press Awards.

Promotions
In November 2011 the Advertising Standards Authority determined that the publication had breached CAP Code (Edition 12) rules 3.1, 3.3 (Misleading advertising), 8.2 and 8.15 (Sales promotions) in a promotion shown in the April edition. This was due to an insufficient deadline being provided for a non time-specific prize which was administered in conjunction with Edinburgh International Science Festival.

See also
 List of magazines published in Scotland

References

External links
 

Listings magazines
Mass media in Edinburgh
Mass media in Glasgow
Mass media in Dundee
Magazines published in Scotland
Magazines established in 2005
Monthly magazines published in the United Kingdom
Music magazines published in the United Kingdom
Mass media in Aberdeen